Étienne Martin (1913–1995) was a French non-figurative sculptor.

Biography 
He was born Henri Étienne-Martin 4 February 1913 in Loriol, Drôme, France. He attended the Ecole des Beaux Arts de Lyon from 1929 to 1933, where he met Marcel Michaud. Martin moved to Paris in 1934, working at the studio of Charles Malfray at the Académie Ranson where he came into contact with such painters as Roger Bissière, Jean Le Moal, Jean Bertholle, Alfred Manessier, Zelman, Véra Pagava, and the sculptor François Stahly. With them, he became part of the group Témoignage, which had exhibitions in Paris in 1938 and 1939. He worked primarily in wood and plaster, creating works inspired by his childhood memories of his home in Loriol. Later sculpture included bronze, string, and textiles.

During World War II Étienne Martin was a prisoner in Germany and was liberated in 1941. In 1942 he traveled to Oppède with Stahly et Zelman and then in 1943-1944 he went to Dieulefit, Drôme where he met the writer Henri-Pierre Roché. Next he moved to Mortagne-au-Perche, Normandy. On his return to Paris in 1947 he lived with Roché, and he met Brâncuși and Gurdjieff. Over the next dozen years he became spiritual, practicing Eastern religions including Taoism.

In 1954 Martin began his series of Demeures (Dwellings) for which he became well known. He received in 1966 the grand prize for sculpture in the 33rd Venice Biennale. He was a professor and head of the sculpture department from 1968 to 1983 at the École nationale supérieure des Beaux-Arts in Paris. He was elected 1971 to the Académie des beaux-arts.

In 1984 an exhibition bringing together all his Demeures was held at the Pompidou Center in Paris. In 2010, June to September, a new exhibition at the Pompidou Center, paid respect to the artist by showing fifteen sculptures, drawing, personal notebooks, and photographs of his studio.

He died on March 21, 1995 in Paris from cardiac arrest.

Works 
His large abstract sculptures build on inspiriation of empty spaces delimited by volume.

 Grand couple, bronze, 1947, at the Fondation Pierre Gianadda, Martigny, Switzerland
 La nuit ouvrante, bronze, 1948, in the Museum of Grenoble
 Tête aux mains, bronze, 1950–1951, in the Musée de Dijon
 Lanleff-Demeure No. 4, bronze, 1961, Nathan Manilow Sculpture Park 
 Demeure 4, 1961, at the Maison de la Culture d'Amiens
 Le Manteau, 1962, in the Pompidou Center, Paris. This was the first fabric in sculpture at this Museum and gained him wide recognition.
 Trois Personnages, 1967, at the Fondation de Coubertin, Saint-Rémy lès Chevreuse, Yvelines
 Abécédaire, 1967, in the Pompidou Center, Paris
 Le Passage, 1969, at the Musée d'Art Moderne de la Ville de Paris
 Le cerbère, chestnut, 1977, in the Musée de Lyon
 Mur miroir, 1979, in the Pompidou Center, Paris
 L'Escalier, wood, metal, plexiglass, rope, paint, 1983 at the Musée de Valence 
 Le collier de la nuit; Les eaux souterraines du désir, mixed media, 1985, in the Museum of Grenoble
 La Ruine, L'Athanor, Demeure 1 at the Bois Orcan in Noyal-sur-Vilaine, (Ille-et-Vilaine)
 Demeure at the Middelheim Open Air Sculpture Museum, Antwerp

See also
 Élisabeth Cibot, a student

References

External links 
 Photos of Étienne Martin by Magnum Photos photographer Martine Franck 
 Works by Étienne Martin in Public places in Paris 
 Works by Étienne Martin at the Pompidou Center 
 Personnage III, 1967, at the Tuileries 
 Works by Étienne Martin at the Museum of outdoor sculpture 
 Étienne Martin at the Parc Jouvet de Valence 
 Étienne Martin at the gallery Bernard Bouche 
 

1995 deaths
1913 births
Burials at Père Lachaise Cemetery
20th-century French sculptors
French male sculptors
Commandeurs of the Ordre des Arts et des Lettres